Balls Island is an island located by Middle Bridge, New York, on the Susquehanna River.

References

Landforms of Chenango County, New York
Islands of the Susquehanna River in New York (state)
Islands of New York (state)